Kurisumuttom (also spelled Kurismuttam) is a locality near to Peyad in the Thiruvananthapuram district of Kerala state, India. The place is situated in the Vilavoorkal Panchayat. It is situated in the south side of Thiruvananthapuram - Kattakkada road, between Thirumala and Peyad. It is 8 Kilometers away from Thiruvananthapuram city. Kurismuttam is under the Peyad Post Office area (PIN 695573).

Nearby places
 St. Xaviers HSS, Peyad
 Kundamanbhagom
 Sky City
 Bharathiya Vidya Bhavan Senior Secondary School
 Jai Nagar, Thirumala
 Guru Gopinath Natanagramam
 Abraham Memorial Higher Secondary School (AMHSS), Thirumala
 Nandanam Hills
 Laurie Baker Centre for Habitat Studies (LBC)
 PEYAD Junction (Commercial Centre)

References

External links
Kurisumuttom - Wikimapia
CSI Kurisumuttom Website

Villages in Thiruvananthapuram district